American pop singer Vitamin C released two studio albums, 7 soundtrack songs, 6 music videos and 6 singles, including her Top 20 single on the Billboard Hot 100, "Smile".

Her eponymous debut album, Vitamin C, was released on August 31, 1999, via Elektra Records and Warner Music Group. The album initially was a commercial failure, not charting on the Billboard 200. However, eventually, it peaked at number 29 on the chart, as well as 3 on the Billboard Top Heatseekers chart. The album was certified Platinum by the RIAA. The album's first single, "Smile", made its way into the Top 20 of the Hot 100, where it reached number 18. The single was also certified Gold by the RIAA. The follow-up single "Me, Myself & I" did not match the success of "Smile", only peaking at number 20 on the Billboard Bubbling Under Hot 100 Singles. A third and final single, "Graduation (Friends Forever)", was released in 2000 and peaked at number 38. It became her second and final Top 40 single on the Hot 100; however, it did reach number 2 on the Australian ARIA Charts and was certified Platinum.

At the end of 2000, Vitamin C released the lead single, "The Itch", for her second studio album, More. The single missed the Top 40, only reaching number 45. In Australia it peaked at number 6 on the ARIA Charts and was certified Platinum.
The second single from More, "As Long as You're Loving Me", failed to make the Hot 100, only charting in New Zealand at number 45. The album, however, was even less of a success, only charting in the lower 100 of the Billboard 200 at number 122. As her popularity began to decline, Vitamin C signed with V2 Records to record a third album. The lead single, "Last Nite", was only released in the United Kingdom. It was a disappointment to the label after only debuting and peaking at number 70 on the UK Singles Chart. Vitamin C was then dropped from the label and no new album surfaced.

As of 2012, Vitamin C is the Vice President of Music for Nickelodeon under her birth name, Colleen Fitzpatrick, according to The Hollywood Reporter.
In 2016 Fitzpatrick, under the Vitamin C moniker, appeared on the song "Don't You Want Me" by Information Society, on their album Orders of Magnitude.

Albums

Studio albums

Singles

Music videos

Soundtrack songs/B-sides

Notes

References 

Pop music discographies
Discographies of American artists